The Nadela or Nadel (Serbian Cyrillic: Надела or Надел) is a system of canals and rivers in northern Serbia, an  long left tributary to the Danube in the Banat region of the Vojvodina province.

Course 

This is just the first of the many sluice gates on the river's course (Tomaševac, Uzdin, Putnikovo, Kovačica, Debeljača) which channel the waters into the southern direction.

Near the village of Uzdin, Nadela's waters are used for the Uzdin fish pond. Until Debeljača the Nadela (in this section also called Veliki kanal or big canal) flows as the real river, but after the Debeljača catchment for the purpose of irrigation, the river shrinks in terms of volume and discharge to the level of a brooklet, which combined with the use of water for industry in Jabuka and Pančevo down the stream and small inclination of the watershed (mouth at ) means that without sluice gates pumps to push the water, the river would stop flowing.

The Nadela continues to the south, close to the villages (each with its own sluice gate) of Crepaja, Jabuka, the town of Pančevo, Starčevo, Omoljica and Ivanovo, where it empties into the Danube, creating an ada (river island), Ivanovo Ostrvo.

The Nadela receives several tributaries and canals, mostly in its latter section: Verovac, Dolovački Begej, Crepajski kanal, Srednji Begej, Ponjavica, etc. It belongs to the Black Sea drainage basin and it is not navigable.

Hydrosystem 

The whole course of the Nadela is organized as one hydrosystem. The river is also used as a drainage canal for the industrial waters (especially from the heavily industrialized Pančevo) which results in the Nadela's extreme pollution in the lower course.

A series of sluice gates serve for several purposes:

 in upper part of the course, to prevent the waters of the Tamiš to spill over during high water levels in rainy years.
 in central part, to prevent the Nadela to spill over itself, during rainy periods and abundance of underground waters.
 in southern part, to prevent the waters of the Danube to spill over during high water levels and to constantly regulate inverse flow of the Danube waters as a result of the Đerdap hydroelectric power plant construction.

In early 2016 a group of local enthusiasts and fishermen organized in an attempt to clean the area of Nadela between Starčevo and Omoljica. Up to that point, the area was severely polluted both from the industrial and agrarian pollution. The concrete overspill station, which kept the constant level of water in the river, was buried under the illegal waste dump so the river at one point completely dried out. They cleaned and dredged the canal, arranged the banks and the surrounding area, adapting it for picnics and recreation.

This central Nadela section was a natural carp spawning area, with Prussian carp and common rudd also living in the river, but they all disappeared because of the pollution. Microclimate also changed, and moist fogs which were beneficial for the arable crops, vegetable gardens and orchids, also vanished. Number of protected birds in the surrounding area dwindled, while a rare local subspecies of southern festoon, which regularly appeared once a year, is no more.

Despite the revitalization in the late 2010s and early 2020s, Nadela remained a dead river. The area is on the cross-European bicycle route EuroVelo 6. Local ecologist proposed creation of the natural park Valjara (meaning "wallowing place")). Locality was named so, as Nadela's waters "wallows" ( from this point, into the Danube direction.

References

External links 

Determining the relative role of different types of pollution at regional scale by using the AHP based participative decision-making model; B. Srdjevic et al.

Rivers of Serbia
Geography of Vojvodina
Banat